Andrzej Elżanowski (born 21 January 1950) is a Polish paleontologist and vertebrate zoologist specializing in bird phylogeny. Together with Peter Wellnhofer he described a coelurosaur theropod Archaeornithoides in 1992. He works also on Mesozoic birds, especially Archaeopterygiformes – he is author of the chapter "Archaeopterygidae" in book edited by Luis Chiappe and Lawrence Witmer entitled Mesozoic Birds: Above the Heads of Dinosaurs. In 2001 he determined that Solnhofen specimen of Archaeopteryx represents new species and genus and coined new specific name – Wellnhoferia grandis – for it. He works now in the Faculty of „Artes Liberales” at the University of Warsaw.

References 

Polish paleontologists
20th-century Polish zoologists
1950 births
Living people
21st-century Polish zoologists